Toumodi-Sakassou is a town in central Ivory Coast. It is a sub-prefecture of Sakassou Department in Gbêkê Region, Vallée du Bandama District.

Toumodi-Sakassou was a commune until March 2012, when it became one of 1126 communes nationwide that were abolished.

In 2014, the population of the sub-prefecture of Toumodi-Sakassou was 4,429.

Villages

The 2 villages of the sub-prefecture of Toumodi-Sakassou and their population in 2014 are:
 Kongo (2 002)
 Toumodi-Sakassou (2 427)

Notes

Sub-prefectures of Gbêkê
Former communes of Ivory Coast